Paulo André Rodrigues Oliveira (born 8 January 1992) is a Portuguese professional footballer who plays for S.C. Braga as a central defender.

He made over 125 Primeira Liga appearances for Vitória de Guimarães, Sporting CP and Braga, winning the Taça de Portugal with the first two clubs in 2013 and 2015 respectively. Abroad, he played regularly for four seasons with Eibar in La Liga.

Oliveira appeared in one match for Portugal, in 2015.

Club career

V. Guimarães
Born in Vila Nova de Famalicão, Braga District, Oliveira was a youth product at Vitória de Guimarães, joining the club's ranks at the age of 13. He made his professional debut in the 2011–12 season, on loan to F.C. Penafiel in the Segunda Liga.

Oliveira returned for the 2012–13 campaign, but started with the reserves also in the second tier. His first official appearance with the main squad occurred on 5 January 2013, as he played the full 90 minutes in a 0–0 away draw against Gil Vicente F.C. in the Primeira Liga. He also contributed four appearances in the Minho team's successful campaign in the Taça de Portugal, including the final win over S.L. Benfica.

Sporting CP
On 19 May 2014, Oliveira signed a five-year deal with Sporting CP of the same league. He appeared in 40 competitive games in his first year and scored three goals, helping to a third-place finish and subsequent qualification for the UEFA Champions League; he made his debut in the competition on 30 September 2014, coming on as a 64th-minute substitute for Maurício in a 0–1 group stage home loss to Chelsea. The following 22 March, he was sent off in the 4–1 win over his previous club also at the Estádio José Alvalade.

Subsequently, Oliveira was only third or fourth-choice stopper for the Jorge Jesus-led side.

Eibar
On 17 July 2017, Oliveira moved to SD Eibar on a four-year contract; in the process, the €3.5 million transfer fee paid for his services became the Spanish club's highest ever, whilst Sporting remained entitled to 30% of his rights and a rebuy option after the first three years. He finished his first season in La Liga with 26 games, as his team finished in ninth place.

Oliveira scored his only goal in the Spanish top division on 17 August 2019, but he also put on past his own net in the 2–1 away defeat against RCD Mallorca. The following 4 January, he was dismissed at the end of a 1–0 loss at Valencia CF.

Braga
Oliveira returned to his country after Eibar's relegation, signing a four-year deal at S.C. Braga on 28 June 2021. He scored his first goal for the club on 26 September, opening a 1–1 draw at C.D. Santa Clara.

International career
Oliveira earned 46 caps for Portugal at youth level, including 23 for the under-21s. He made his only appearance for the full side on 31 March 2015, starting in a 0–2 friendly defeat against Cape Verde in Estoril.

Career statistics

Honours
Vitória Guimarães
Taça de Portugal: 2012–13

Sporting CP
Taça de Portugal: 2014–15
Supertaça Cândido de Oliveira: 2015

Portugal U21
UEFA European Under-21 Championship runner-up: 2015

References

External links

1992 births
Living people
People from Vila Nova de Famalicão
Sportspeople from Braga District
Portuguese footballers
Association football defenders
Primeira Liga players
Liga Portugal 2 players
Campeonato de Portugal (league) players
Vitória S.C. players
F.C. Penafiel players
Vitória S.C. B players
Sporting CP footballers
Sporting CP B players
S.C. Braga players
La Liga players
SD Eibar footballers
Portugal youth international footballers
Portugal under-21 international footballers
Portugal international footballers
Portuguese expatriate footballers
Expatriate footballers in Spain
Portuguese expatriate sportspeople in Spain